| ru_coachyears = 
| school = 
| university = 
| relatives =
| ru_ntupdate = 
}}

Darren Burns (born 8 March 1973 in Biggar, Scotland) is a former Scotland A  and Scotland 7s international rugby union player who played for Glasgow Warriors. He played in the Lock position.

Burns signed for Glasgow Warriors from Edinburgh Rugby in 1999. He was one of the original intake of 36 professional players who were signed by the SRU, and he played for Edinburgh Rugby from 1996.

At amateur level, Burns played for Boroughmuir RFC, Biggar RFC and Watsonians

At international level Burns played for Scotland 7s and also played for the Scotland A and Scotland Under 21 side. He played for the Barbarians when they entered a 7s side into the famous Melrose Sevens tournament. He also played for a combined Scottish Districts team against Australia.

He coached Biggar RFC and Queensfery RFC.

Burns is now a Student and Adult Participation Manager for the Scottish Rugby Union. Of his role he stated: "At Scottish Rugby we are committed to sustaining and enhancing the numbers playing the game, particularly at that crucial period when boys and girls leave school and, either go into further education, or the world of work."

External links 

EPCR Profile

References 

1973 births
Living people
Biggar RFC players
Boroughmuir RFC players
Edinburgh Rugby players
Glasgow Warriors players
Male rugby sevens players
Rugby union players from Biggar, South Lanarkshire
Scotland 'A' international rugby union players
Scotland international rugby sevens players
Scottish rugby union players
Watsonians RFC players